Kimr or Gimr is an ethnic group in West Darfur in Sudan and Chad. They speak Gimr, a dialect of Tama, a Nilo-Saharan language. The population of this ethnicity possibly is below 10,000. One 1996 source puts the population at over 50,000.

History 
Historically, the Kimr have been located between the Sultanate of Darfur and the Sultanate of Wadai. They became tributaries to Wadai from the early 17th century to the 1874. The Ottomans conquered the region in 1874 via Egypt and the Kimr paid tribute to them until 1882. From that time until 1910, the Kimr suffered from armies of Masalits, Furs, the French, and the Mahdists. After the establishment of the Anglo-Egyptian Sudan, the Kimr nobility were incorporated into the new administrative structure.

Culture 
The Kimr engage in dryland farming with crops like millet being commonly cultivated. Some Kimr have opted to migrate to areas like Southern Darfur or the city of Darfur to seek work.

The Kimr are Muslims.

References

Ethnic groups in Chad
Ethnic groups in Sudan
Darfur